Lufia, known as  in Japan, was a series of role-playing video games developed by Neverland (aside from The Ruins of Lore, which was developed by Atelier Double). In Japan, the games were originally published by Taito and later, its now-parent company Square Enix (with Curse of the Sinistrals), and after the closing of Taito's North American branch after the release of the first game, Natsume Inc. (Rise of the Sinistrals, The Legend Returns, and Curse of the Sinistrals) and Atlus USA (The Ruins of Lore) in the U.S. While the games are primarily traditional 2D RPGs, they draw on elements from many other genres including action-adventure, monster collecting, and puzzle games. In the 1990s the games were originally developed on the Super NES while the most recent installment, Lufia: Curse of the Sinistrals, was developed for the Nintendo DS and was released in 2010 for Japan on February 25 and for North America on October 12. The series currently consists of six games, including this most recent installment.

Setting 

The Lufia series spans the course of two centuries, beginning with the defeat of the god-like Sinistrals in Lufia II: Rise of the Sinistrals. These events are followed by Ruins of Lore, which takes place 20 years after Rise of the Sinistrals ends. Fortress of Doom picks up another 79 years (99 years after the events of Rise of the Sinistrals) later. The current series ends with the Sinistrals' final defeat in Legend Returns, which takes place 101 years after Fortress of Doom.

Characters 

Lufia follows the exploits of the hero Maxim and his quest to defeat the Sinistrals; after his death, this task is taken up by his descendants through several generations. One of his descendants is Wain, the main male protagonist of The Legend Returns.

List of media

Video games

Canceled titles

Reception

See also
 List of Square Enix video game franchises

References

External links 
 Lufia World

 
Square Enix franchises
Video game franchises
Video game franchises introduced in 1993